Samuli Kaislasalo (born ) is a Finnish male volleyball player. He is part of the Finland men's national volleyball team. On the club level, he plays for Raision Loimu.

References

External links
 profile at FIVB.org

1995 births
Living people
Finnish men's volleyball players
Place of birth missing (living people)